Prehistoric pile dwellings around the Alps are a series of prehistoric pile dwelling (or stilt house) settlements in and around the Alps built from about 5000 to 500 BC on the edges of lakes, rivers or wetlands. In 2011, 111 sites located variously in Switzerland (56), Italy (19), Germany (18), France (11), Austria (5) and Slovenia (2) were added to the UNESCO World Heritage Site list. In Slovenia, these were the first World Heritage Sites to be listed for their cultural value.

Excavations conducted at some of the sites have yielded evidence regarding prehistoric life and the way communities interacted with their environment during the Neolithic and Bronze Ages in Alpine Europe. These settlements are a unique group of exceptionally well-preserved and culturally rich archaeological sites, which constitute one of the most important sources for the study of early agrarian societies in the region.

Contrary to popular belief, the dwellings were not erected over water, but on nearby marshy land. They were set on piles to protect against occasional flooding. Because the lakes have grown in size over time, many of the original piles are now under water, giving modern observers the false impression that they have always been this way.

Map

Sites

Gallery

See also 
 Prehistoric pile dwellings around Lake Zurich
 Cortaillod culture
 Horgen culture
 Pfyn culture
 Clairvaux-les-Lacs

References

External links 

 Prehistoric Pile Dwellings around the Alps : UNESCO Official Website

  

World Heritage Sites in Austria
World Heritage Sites in France
World Heritage Sites in Germany
World Heritage Sites in Italy
World Heritage Sites in Slovenia
World Heritage Sites in Switzerland
Municipality of Ig
Ljubljana Marshes
Stilt houses
Prehistoric Slovenia
5th-millennium BC establishments